Yevgeni Evgenyevich Artyukhin (born 4 April 1983) is a Russian professional ice hockey right winger who is currently an unrestricted free agent. He last played competitively for HC Neftekhimik Nizhnekamsk of the Kontinental Hockey League (KHL).

Playing career
After spending most of the 2005–06 season with the Tampa Bay Lightning, Artyukhin left for Russia after contract negotiations soured with Tampa Bay.

When the 2006–07 season ended with Lokomotiv Yaroslavl, Artyukhin rejected a $475,000 contract offer from the Lightning. His agent, Mark Gandler, asked Tampa Bay to trade him, claiming the Lightning were punishing Artyukhin for not re-signing a year before. It was believed Artyukhin was seeking a $1 million contract. In 2007–08, he played for CSKA Moscow, recording 9 points and 99 penalty minutes in 23 games. On 7 July 2008, the Lightning signed Artyukhin to a two-year, $1.9 million contract.

On 13 August 2009, Artyukhin was traded to the Anaheim Ducks in exchange for Drew Miller and a third-round draft pick. On 21 October 2009, Artyukhin was also suspended for three games after slewfooting Dallas Stars' defenceman Matt Niskanen. Although there was no original penalty called by the referees during the match, the NHL suspended him after reviewing the play. Artyukhin later publicly apologized, saying the incident was unintentional.

Evgeny was invited to the 2010 Winter Olympics summer camp for Russian national team, but did not make the final roster cut. On 1 March 2010, he was traded to the Atlanta Thrashers in exchange for Nathan Oystrick and a conditional pick.

On 24 April 2011, Artyukhin received a 5+20 minute penalty for his part in a brawl in Euro Hockey Tour.

In the 2016–17 season, Artyukin signed a one-year contract to captain Sibir Novosibirsk on June 29, 2016. He appeared in a career-high 54 Kontinental Hockey League games, registering five goals and nine points. After his contract expired, Artyukhin signed a one-year contract with Dynamo Moscow on August 28, 2017.

As a free agent, Artyukhin opted to sit out the entirety of the 2018–19 season. On 17 May 2019, Artyukhin resumed his career in agreeing to a one-year contract with his original club, HC Vityaz.

As a free agent leading into the 2021–22 season, Artyukhin was brought in on a one-year contract to add experience by cellar-dwelling Admiral Vladivostok on 28 September 2021. Artyukhin went scoreless in 22 appearances with Admiral before he was traded to Neftekhimik Nizhnekamsk on 21 December 2021.

Personal life
Artyukhin's father, Evgeny Artyukhin, Sr., and elder brother Sergei were international heavyweight Greco-Roman wrestlers.

Career statistics

Regular season and playoffs

International

References

External links
 

1983 births
Living people
Admiral Vladivostok players
Anaheim Ducks players
Atlanta Thrashers players
Avangard Omsk players
Atlant Moscow Oblast players
HC CSKA Moscow players
HC Dynamo Moscow players
Hershey Bears players
Lokomotiv Yaroslavl players
Moncton Wildcats players
HC Neftekhimik Nizhnekamsk players
Pensacola Ice Pilots players
Russian ice hockey right wingers
HC Sibir Novosibirsk players
SKA Saint Petersburg players
Ice hockey people from Moscow
Springfield Falcons players
Tampa Bay Lightning draft picks
Tampa Bay Lightning players
HC Vityaz players